Bert van t'Hoff is a Dutch tenor who specializes in Baroque music in historically informed performance.

He performed in 1965 the tenor arias in an early recording of Nikolaus Harnoncourt of Bach's St John Passion, with Kurt Equiluz as the Evangelist and Max van Egmond as the vox Christi (voice of Christ).

References

External links 
 Bert van t'Hoff (in Flemish) muziekweb.nl

Dutch tenors
Bach singers
Living people
20th-century Dutch male singers
20th-century classical musicians
Year of birth missing (living people)